Darbechtar ( known also as Darb Ishtar) is a village located on the South-Eastern periphery of the Koura District in the North Governorate of the Republic of Lebanon.

Darbechtar borders the villages of Amyoun, Bziza, Majdel, Kaftoun, and Dar-shmizzine. The Village is particularly famous for the Bou Ghosn, Chalouhi, Zoughbi,  and other families.

The Lebanese hailing from Darbechtar number 10,000 worldwide. 85% of them live outside Lebanon, mainly in Brazil, Argentina, Australia, Canada, the United States, and Uruguay.)

The population of Darbechtar is Maronite Christian.

Etymology

The name of the village is derivative of the Aramaic words, Dar and Ishtar, meaning the House of Astarte. It is believed that the village was the site of an ancient Phoenician shrine for the Goddess of Fertility.)

Climate
Darbechtar     : Mediterranean plain village with heavy rains, mild winters and hot dry arid summers.

Min / Max average temperatures in Celsius Degree
Jan (8/16) Feb (9/16) Mar (10/19) Apr (13/22) May (16/25) Jun (19/27) Jul (22/29) Aug (23/30) Sep (20/29) Oct (17/27) Nov (13/22) Dec (10/18)

Environment

The village is the home of Olive oil production. Therefore, most of the village is planted with the ever green Olive Trees along with Grapes, Figs, variety of bushes, plants, and flowers.)

Olive oil extraction

Traditionally, olive oil was produced by crushing olives in stone or wooden mortars or beam presses. Nowadays, olives are ground to tiny bits, obtaining a paste that is mixed with water and processed by a centrifuge, which extracts the oil from the paste, leaving behind pomace.)

Uses of the Olive Fruit

Olive Oil is used in cooking, cosmetics, pharmaceuticals, and soaps, and as a fuel for traditional oil lamps. Olive oil is a healthful oil because of its high content of monounsaturated fat (mainly oleic acid) and polyphenols.)

Places of worship
There are 4 places of Christian worship in Darbechtar mainly Churches:
Church of Saint George
Church of Saint Elias
Church of Saint Chalita
Church of our Lady of Saydeh
Church of St Joseph

Photo gallery

References

External links
Dar Baaechtar, Localiban

Populated places in the North Governorate
Koura District
Archaeological sites in Lebanon